The secretary of foreign affairs (Filipino: Kalihim ng Ugnayang Panlabas) is the Cabinet of the Philippines member in charge of implementing foreign policy for the government of the Philippines as the head of the Department of Foreign Affairs.

The current secretary is Enrique Manalo, who assumed office on July 1, 2022.

List of secretaries of foreign affairs

References

External links
DFA website

 
Foreign Affairs